Ganesh Suntharalingam (born March 1967) OBE FRCA FFICM is a British anaesthetist, the president of the Intensive Care Society and the former medical lead of North West London Critical Care Network. In 2006 he led the successful treatment of six volunteers who had become critically ill after being given a new drug at a private trials unit within the grounds of Northwick Park Hospital where he worked. The editor of New England Journal of Medicine later stated that “all six volunteers survived in part because of the extraordinary intensive care delivered during the critical stages of their illness”.

References

External links 
https://uk.linkedin.com/in/ganeshicm
https://www.researchgate.net/profile/Ganesh_Suntharalingam

Living people
1967 births
British anaesthetists
Fellows of the Royal College of Anaesthetists